Samantha "Murphy" Bromberg (born July 12, 1995) is an American diver.

Bromberg is the daughter of Danny and Karen Bromberg. She graduated from Bexley High School in 2013 and attended the University of Texas.

She participated at the 2019 World Aquatics Championships, winning a medal.

As a collegian, Bromberg made All-America four times and was the Big 12 Conference Diver of the Year in 2017-2018 and 2018-2019 in addition to being a Big 12 champion five times. She also was a finalist at the U.S. Olympic Diving Trials in 2016 and the FINA World Championships in 2013.

On July 14, 2019, Bromberg and Katrina Young won the bronze medal in the FINA World Championships' synchronized 10-meter diving event, clinching the United States' first spot in the 2020 Olympic Games.

References

External links

1995 births
Living people
American female divers
World Aquatics Championships medalists in diving
People from Bexley, Ohio
Texas Longhorns women's divers